Maipú Department may refer to:

Maipú Department, Chaco, Argentina
Maipú Department, Mendoza, Argentina